Portrait of a Gentleman with a Letter is a 1535–1540 painting by Moretto da Brescia, now in the Pinacoteca Tosio Martinengo in Brescia, to which it was given in 1854. No record of it before that dates survives, though some art historians have identified it with a lost Portrait of Pietro Aretino recorded in correspondence.

References

Bibliography (in Italian)
 Camillo Boselli, Il Moretto, 1498-1554, in "Commentari dell'Ateneo di Brescia per l'anno 1954 - Supplemento", Brescia 1954
 Pietro Da Ponte, L'opera del Moretto, Brescia 1898
 Ugo Fleres, La pinacoteca dell'Ateneo in Brescia in "Le gallerie nazionali italiane", anno 4, 1899
 Gustavo Frizzoni, La Pinacoteca comunale Martinengo in Brescia in "Archivio storico dell'arte", Brescia 1889
 Giovanni Morelli, Kunstkritische Studien über italienische Malerei - Die Galerien Borghese und Doria Panfili in Rom, Leipzig 1890
 Giorgio Nicodemi, La pinacoteca Tosio e Martinengo, Bologna 1927
 Gaetano Panazza, I Civici Musei e la Pinacoteca di Brescia, Bergamo 1958
 Gaetano Panazza, La Pinacoteca e i Musei di Brescia, nuova edizione, Bergamo 1968
 Pier Virgilio Begni Redona, Alessandro Bonvicino – Il Moretto da Brescia, Editrice La Scuola, Brescia 1988
 Adolfo Venturi, Storia dell'arte italiana, volume IX, La pittura del Cinquecento, Milano 1929

Portraits of men
16th-century portraits
1540 paintings
Paintings by Moretto da Brescia
Paintings in the collection of the Pinacoteca Tosio Martinengo